Night of the Living Shred is the second studio album by guitarist Joe Stump, released in 1994 through Leviathan Records.

Critical reception

Robert Taylor at AllMusic gave Night of the Living Shred two stars out of five, calling it a "callow recording" and saying Stump's "self-indulgent playing lacks any sort of dynamics." Further criticism was directed at Stump for sounding "like a Malmsteen/Blackmore clone".

Track listing

Personnel
Joe Stump – guitar, bass (track 1), production
Jeff Tortora – drums
John Risti – bass (except tracks 1, 7), Moog Taurus
Jimmy Simpson – bass (track 7)

References

Joe Stump albums
1994 albums